Brian F McLean (born January 19, 1977) is an American special effects person.

He was born in Syracuse, New York. He received a Bachelor of Fine Arts in sculpture in 1999 from Boston University.

He is the director of rapid prototype at LAIKA. Known for his works on acclaimed stop motion films such as Coraline (2009), ParaNorman (2012), The Boxtrolls (2014) and Kubo and the Two Strings for which he received an Academy Award for Best Visual Effects nomination at the 89th Academy Awards, that he shared with Steve Emerson, Oliver Jones, and Brad Schiff.

In 2016, he was awarded a Scientific and Engineering Award – an Academy plaque; at the Academy Scientific and Technical Awards from the Academy of Motion Pictures Arts and Science that he shared with Martin Meunier for pioneering the use of rapid prototyping and 3D printing in character animation-stop motion film productions.

Filmography

Awards
 2009: Annie Award for Special Achievement in Animation - Coraline 
 2015: Academy Scientific and Technical Awards (Academy Plaque) - "for pioneering the use of rapid prototyping for character animation in stop-motion film production."
 2016: (nomination) Academy Award for Best Visual Effects - Kubo and the Two Strings
 2017: Boston University - College of Fine Arts Distinguished Alumni Award

References

External links
 Brian McLean at LAIKA
 

Living people
Special effects people
Academy Award for Technical Achievement winners
1977 births